Katha Sangama may refer to:
 Katha Sangama (1976 film), an Indian Kannada-language anthology film
 Katha Sangama (2019 film), an Indian Kannada-language anthology film